Pitbull Starring in Rebelution is the fourth studio album by the Cuban-American rapper Pitbull. It was released on August 28, 2009, through J, Polo Grounds and Mr. 305. The production on the album was handled by multiple producers including DJ Khalil, Dr. Luke, Lil Jon, Play-N-Skillz and Jim Jonsin who also served as executive producer. The album also features guest appearances by B.o.B, Ke$ha, Nayer, Akon, Lil Jon and Slim of 112. This became his first major-label release, his first album to be released on his own Mr. 305 Inc. label and also Polo Grounds' second release since Hurricane Chris's 51/50 Ratchet.

Pitbull Starring in Rebelution was supported by four singles: "Krazy", "I Know You Want Me (Calle Ocho)", "Shut It Down" and "Hotel Room Service". The album received generally positive reviews from music critics and was a moderate commercial success. The album debuted at number eight on the US Billboard 200 chart, selling 41,000 copies its first week.

Singles
The album spawned four singles. The first single from the album was "Krazy". It was released on September 30, 2008 and was produced by and featured Lil Jon. It also peaked at number 30 on the US Billboard Hot 100. The song samples Federico Franchi's 2007 song, "Cream". The second single was "I Know You Want Me (Calle Ocho)". It was released on February 24, 2009. The single eventually peaked at number two on the US Billboard Hot 100. The song is a vocal mix of "75, Brazil Street" by Nicola Fasano Vs Pat Rich. The third single was "Hotel Room Service". It peaked at number eight on the US Billboard Hot 100, becoming the second single was the album to reach the top-ten. The song recreates elements from "Push the Feeling On" by Nightcrawlers. The fourth single was "Shut It Down", featuring Akon. It was released on November 2, 2009, with the music video. The single eventually peaked at number 42 on the US Billboard Hot 100.

Promotional singles
 "Hotel Room Service (Remix)" featuring Nicole Scherzinger was released on October 9, 2009 as a promotional single and was included on the deluxe version of the album that was released on 23rd of that same month.

Promotional music videos
 "Can't Stop Me Now" featuring The New Royales was released on June 14, 2010 on Pitbull's YouTube channel.

Legal issues
In 2009, the reggae band Rebelution sued Pitbull for trademark infringement based on the name of this album. In 2010, the court rejected Pitbull's request for summary judgment.

Critical reception
Pitbull Starring in Rebelution was met with "mixed or average" reviews from critics. At Metacritic, which assigns a weighted average rating out of 100 to reviews from mainstream publications, this release received an average score of 51 based on 7 reviews.

In a review for AllMusic, David Jeffries wrote: "On the mistitled Rebelution, rapper Pitbull takes a cue from his homeboy Flo Rida and dives headfirst into the lucrative world of ultra-slick Miami club-rap. Even if it's not the most persuasive mood album, once the party has kicked into high gear Rebelution will certainly keep it going." Ayala Ben-Yehuda of Billboard gave a mixed review, explaing: "You either love or hate Pitbull's music, and sometimes a little of both when listening to the same album. As with the Miami rapper's past releases, his newest set, "Rebelution," is a mix of infectious dance hooks and rapid-fire rhymes — some are clever and fun, others are just plain graphic."

Commercial Performance
Pitbull Starring in Rebelution debuted at number eight on the US Billboard 200 chart, selling 41,000 copies its first week, according to Nielsen Soundscan. This became Pitbull's first US top-ten debut. As of April 2012, the album had sold  249,000 copies in the US. On October 16, 2020, the album was certified gold by the Recording Industry Association of America (RIAA) for combined sales and album-equivalent units of over 500,000 units in the United States.

Track listing

Notes
 signifies a co-producer

Sample credits
 "I Know You Want Me (Calle Ocho)" contains a sample of "75 Brazil Street", written by David Wolinski, Daniel Seraphine, Nicola Fasano, Stefano Bosco, and Patrick Gonella, as performed by Nicola Fasano.
 "Girls" contains a portion of "Atomic Dog", written by George Clinton, Garry Shider, and David Spradley.
 "Full of Shit" contains a sample of "Pony", written by Steve Garrett, Elgin Lumpkins, and Timothy Mosley, as performed by Ginuwine.
 "Hotel Room Service" contains:
 a portion of "Rapper's Delight", written by Nile Rodgers and Bernard Edwards.
 a portion of "One and One", written by Luther Campbell, David Hobbs, Mark Ross, and Christopher Wong Won.
 a sample from "Push the Feeling On", written by Hugh Brankin, Ross Campbell, John Reid, and Graham Wilson.
 "Krazy" contains a sample of "Cream", written and performed by Federico Franchi.
 "Pearly Gates" contains a portion of "Heaven", written by Bryan Adams and Jim Vallance.

Charts

Weekly charts

Year-end charts

Certifications

See also
"Rebelution Tour"

References

External links 
 Rebelution on Spotify

2009 albums
Albums produced by Dr. Luke
Albums produced by Jim Jonsin
Albums produced by Lil Jon
Albums produced by DJ Khalil
Pitbull (rapper) albums
J Records albums
Hip house albums